McGregor's skink (Oligosoma macgregori) is a species of lizard in the family Scincidae.  The species is endemic to New Zealand.

Etymology
The specific name, macgregori, is in honor of New Zealand zoologist William Roy McGregor.

Geographic range
In New Zealand O. macgregori is found on the Cavalli Islands, on Mana Island, and in the North Island at the Hauraki Gulf.

Description
O. macgregori is a medium-sized lizard species.

Reproduction
O. macgregori is viviparous.

References

Further reading
Chapple DG, Ritchie PA, Daugherty CH (2009). "Origin, diversification, and systematics of the New Zealand skink fauna (Reptilia: Scincidae)". Molecular Phylogenetics and Evolution 52 (2): 470–487. (Oligosoma macgregori, new combination).
Hardy GS (1977). "The New Zealand Scincidae (Reptilia: Lacertilia); a taxonomic and zoogeographic study". New Zealand J. Zool. 4: 221–325. (Cyclodina macgregori, new combination, p. 272).
Robb J (1975). "Two new skinks of the genus Leiolopisma from New Zealand". Proc. Koninklijke Nederlandse Akademie van Wetenscappe 78 (5): 477–483. (Leiolopisma macgregori, new species, p. 480).
van Winkel, Dylan; Baling, Marleen; Hitchmough, Rod (2019). Reptiles and Amphibians of New Zealand: A Field Guide. Auckland, New Zealand: Auckland University Press. 376 pp. .

External links
Images of McGregors skink at Wildscreen Arkive.

Reptiles of New Zealand
Oligosoma
Reptiles described in 1975
Taxa named by Joan Robb
Taxonomy articles created by Polbot